Ramakrishna Mission Swami Vivekananda's Ancestral House and Cultural Centre is a museum and cultural centre. It is located at 105 Vivekananda Road, Kolkata, India. In this house, Swami Vivekananda (then called Narendranath Datta) was born on 12 January 1863. The house remained Vivekananda's home throughout his childhood and early youth. The cultural centre was inaugurated by the President of India A. P. J. Abdul Kalam.

History 

After the death of his father (Vishwanath Datta) in 1884, Narendranath's aunt, who was living with them in that house, claimed full possession of the property. She filed a lawsuit against Narendranath's mother (Bhuvaneswari Devi) and her family. Vivekananda won the case in the lower court, but the case was appealed to a higher court. The case continued for many years in higher courts. It concluded only a few days before Vivekananda's death in 1902. According to the final ruling in the case, Vivekananda was awarded full legal possession of his ancestral house.

Renovation 
Over time, the ancestral house of Vivekananda became dilapidated. In 1962, Ramakrishna Mission authorities decided to acquire the property and turn it into a museum. In May 1999, the Ramakrishna Mission acquired the land and the adjacent plot through the Government of West Bengal. A committee was set up for this project. In 2004, after renovation, the house was turned into a museum and cultural centre.

Currently, Vivekananda's ancestral home is spread over 22,000 square feet and houses a museum, a research centre, a memorial shrine, a library, an English centre, a computer training centre, and a charitable dispensary. Seminars and conventions are also regularly organised here. There is a Shiva Lingam located at the premises.

Gallery

References 

Swami Vivekananda
Ramakrishna Mission
Museums in Kolkata